ELinOS is a commercial development environment for embedded Linux. It consists of a Linux distribution for the target embedded system and development tools for a development host computer. The development host computer usually is a standard desktop computer running Linux or Windows. The Linux system and the application software for the target device are both created on the development host.

ELinOS focuses on industrial applications. For that purpose optional extensions for the Linux kernel are provided. The kernel will always be specifically compiled for the embedded system. Userspace applications are provided as pre-compiled binaries in order to save time for compilation. Most of the ELinOS software packages are open source and licensed under the GPL.

ELinOS provides embedded Linux as a standalone operating system or it can be integrated into the PikeOS virtualization platform if safety and security demands cannot be met by Linux alone. The latter might be the case if a certification according to a strict industry standard is required.

Eclipse is the technical basis for the functionality provided by the integrated development environment (IDE) on the development host.

ELinOS was first published in 1999. A free ELinOS Test Version can be downloaded.

Typical workflow 
1. Select the hardware of the target embedded system
 Choose one of the provided board support packages (BSP) or configure the hardware on your own
2. Select the features wanted on the target system
 Examples are real-time support, remote debugging support, networking functionality and a choice of networking servers
3. Compile the Linux kernel
 Based on the previous steps an individual kernel configuration will be proposed. It can be modified manually.
4. Generate the target's file system image
 Based on the previous steps contents for an individual file system will be proposed. Files can be added or removed. Dependencies will be checked and can be resolved automatically.
5. Deploy the file system image to the target system.
 The result of the previous step is a single binary file which the target device can boot 
6. Test and analyze the software on the target system using the tracing tool
 Monitor the system's behavior and optimize the application or the system configuration
7. Debug the application software on the target system using the debugger
 Faults can be debugged using the IDE on the development host

Supported hardware 

The following processor architectures are supported, with a large set of board support packages (BSP) for various boards:

 ARM (v7)
 ARM64 (v8)
 PowerPC (32Bit and 64Bit)
 x86
 x86-64

Symmetric multiprocessing is supported if a multi-core processor is used.

End of Life Overview

References

External links
 SYSGO's official site

Embedded Linux distributions
Virtualization software for Linux
Linux distributions